Almirante Brown Department is the westernmost department of Chaco Province in Argentina.

The provincial subdivision has a population of about 28,000 inhabitants in an area of  17,276 km², and its capital city is Pampa del Infierno, which is located around 1,265 km from the Capital federal.

The department is named in honour of William Brown (1777 -1857), the Irish born commander in chief of the Argentine Navy.

Attractions

The city of Pampa del Infierno hosts the annual Fiesta Provincial del Chivo (Provincial Goat Festival).

Settlements

Concepción del Bermejo
Los Frentones
Pampa del Infierno
Taco Pozo

References

External links
Pampa del Infierno webpage (Spanish)
Provincial site

1937 establishments in Argentina
Departments of Chaco Province